Debout Les Belges! (Belgians, Rise up!) is a far-right political group in Belgium, founded and led by avowedly anti-Zionist Belgian MP Laurent Louis, who was previously associated with the Islamist party ISLAM.

The group is associated with French comedian Dieudonné M'bala M'bala and the quenelle gesture which he has popularized, often considered a subversive allusion to the Nazi salute. Although its leader has recently criticized Alain Soral, another important leader of Reconciliation Nationale. The group has been accused of antisemitism and a planned gathering of notable anti-Zionists organized by Louis was banned in 2014.

References

Website
Debout Les Belges! website

Far-right political parties in Belgium
Francophone political parties in Belgium